Milk Mantra is a dairy foods company based in Odisha, India founded in August 2009 by former director at Tetley Srikumar Misra and cofounded by Rashima Misra and Lt Col Ashit Mahapatra, to solve the trust deficit between consumers and food in India arising out of opaque supply chains and adulterated food. First operational in 2012, it is India's first venture capital-backed agri-foods startup. It was set up to solve the milk scarcity problem in the state. Milk Mantra has been built as a purpose driven socially responsible business that seeks to rebalance capitalism by leveraging brand capital to create impact at scale.

Milk Mantra and Srikumar Misra have been featured on the front page of the Wall Street Journal, in case studies by Stanford Business School and Indian Institute of Ahmedabad and also extensively covered by leading academia and media.

History
Milk Mantra was founded in August 2009 by Srikumar Misra, a former executive with Tata Group, Rashima Misra and Lt Col Ashit Mahapatra. Its first series of investments were received from VC firms Eight Roads Adventures and Aavishkaar Venture Management Services and angel investors. The company took 18 months to complete its series funding and started its operations in early 2011 with the commissioning of a factory in Gop in Odisha.

In April 2011, the company started the Ethical Milk Sourcing programme, “Happy Farmers = Happy Cows = Best Milk!” in two villages in Puri District. In June 2011, the company developed its 3-layer packaging technique called 'Tripak' which prevents the milk contents from light damage. In 2012, it launched its products in Bhubaneswar and Kolkata with services like direct-to-home milk delivery. In 2013, it launched a range of Easter India's first probiotic curd. In December 2014, it acquired Westernland Dairy, which extended Milk Mantra's reach to Jharkhand and Chhattisgarh.

Milk Mantra comes with a distinct brand proposition, “No More Boiling” with an USP that lies in its packaging which promises improved shelf life of its dairy products.

In 2013, Stanford Business School did a 3 part case study on Milk Mantra and Aavishkaar on raising VC funding in India.

On June 21, 2016, RBI Governor Raghuram Rajan visited the plant  of Milk Mantra and met its management, employees and some women farmers to understand the business model of the startup which sources its chief product (milk) from over 70,000 farmers in the state, called the Ethical Milk Sourcing (EMS) programme.

In 2016, Milk Mantra rolled out a functional ready-to-drink healthy milk beverage MooShake and was piloted in Bengaluru and Hyderabad.

In 2018, on a state visit to Bhubaneswar for the 'Commonwealth Lunch’, the British High Commissioner to the Republic of India, Sir Dominic Asquith along with his wife and the Deputy High Commissioner Mr. Bruce Bucknell visited the Milk Mantra office.

In 2021 the company launched its own D2C dairy & subscription app DailyMoo to directly connect with its consumers.

Funding 
Between 2010 and 2017, Milk Mantra raised a total capital of USD 19 million (₹140 crores) in funding from a group of 20 angel investors which included Aavishkaar Venture Trustees and Eight Roads Ventures (then Fidelity Growth Partners India), and Neev Fund.

In 2020, Milk Mantra raised USD 10 million debt funding from US DFC for scaling up & executing geographic expansion plans, building an awesome challenger brand and a digital financial services platform for the company’s ethical sourcing network. It also received technical assistance grant of USD 350,000.

List of investors 
Aavishkaar Venture Trustees
Neev Fund
Eight Roads Ventures
US DFC

Products
Milk Mantra, under the brand name Milky Moo manufactures and sells various milk products like buttermilk, curd, probiotic yogurt, cheese, cottage cheese, milkshakes, dairy based desserts and other beverages under the brand Milky Moo.

Under the brand Moo Shake, the company also manufactures and sells flavored milkshakes.

In early 2015, Milk Mantra entered the health food industry by launching MooShake. Under the brand, it produces a health beverage which is blended with curcumin, an extract from turmeric, believed to have multiple health benefits. It was first launched in Bengaluru. MooShake products have a shelf life of 180 days. Srikumar Misra has also received a US Patent for MooShake with the patent numbers US-10750758-B2 and US-10052293-B2.

Production 
Milk Mantra has its main processing plant at Gop in Puri city of Odisha. It has a processing capacity of 2,40,000 liters of milk per day. The startup also has a plant in the neighbouring Sambalpur which can process 90000 liters per day.

Honors 
Fast Company 10 most innovative Asia-Pacific companies of 2021
Milk Mantra has been recognized as most innovative companies of 2020 in India and 10 most innovative Asia-Pacific companies of 2021 by Fast company.
Fast Company Most innovative companies of 2020 in India
In 2019, Milk Mantra was awarded as laureate of the prestigious McNulty Prize. The award was decided by a high profile jury and given by former secretary of state Madeleine Albright at Aspen, Colorado, USA.
2016 Frost & Sullivan Awards for Product of the Year Award for MooShake
2014 – Emerging Business Leader Award (Srikumar Misra)

References

External links

Dairy products companies of India
Indian brands
Companies based in Odisha
2009 establishments in Orissa
Indian companies established in 2009
Food and drink companies established in 2009